The Kizilgaha Caves consist in a Buddhist Temple inside a complex of caves in the area of Kucha, Xinjiang, China. The paintings in the cave go back to the 5th century CE. Other famous sites nearby are the Ah-ai Grotto, Kizil Caves, Kumtura, Subashi Temple and the Simsim caves.

Gallery

References

Central Asian Buddhist sites
Chinese Buddhist grottoes
Caves of Xinjiang
Silk Road
Religion in Xinjiang
Major National Historical and Cultural Sites in Xinjiang
Buddhist temples in Aksu Prefecture